Anthony Biggs (born 17 April 1936) is an English former footballer who played as a forward in the Football League for Arsenal and Leyton Orient. He won three international caps for England at amateur level and played minor counties cricket for Middlesex's second XI.

Career statistics

References

External links
 

1936 births
Living people
English footballers
Association football forwards
Hounslow F.C. players
Arsenal F.C. players
Leyton Orient F.C. players
Guildford City F.C. players
English Football League players
England amateur international footballers
English cricketers